Yabes Roni Malaifani (born 6 February 1995) is an Indonesian professional footballer who plays as a winger for Liga 1 club Bali United and the Indonesia national team.

Early life
Born in Alor Moro February 6, 1995, Yabes had to travel using public transportation for 1 hour to hone his football ability. Although only joined hometown club, but the spirit of the eldest of the two brothers never fades. Yabes himself admitted that his talent was first discovered by the coach, Indra Sjafri in mid-June 2013 ago. At that time, Indra Sjafri was around Indonesia looking for players to be plotted strengthen Indonesia in the AFF U-19 Youth Championship and AFC U-19 Championship.

Indra then opened the selection process in Kupang, East Nusa Tenggara (NTT). Hearing the news, Yabes who was then only 18 years old decided to fly to the location selection.

Club career

Early career 
Yabes started playing football since the age of 6. He has played for hometown club PS KDP and Persap Alor. During his time in Persap Alor, his talent was spotted by Indonesia U-19 head coach Indra Sjafri, subsequently Indra called him for the national team.

Bali United
In 2015, Yabes joined newly rebranded club, Bali United, this move would saw him sign his first professional contract as well as being reunited with former national coach, Indra Sjafri. Yabes made his club debut in 2016 season on 1 May 2016 in a match against Pusamania Borneo in a 1–1 draw. and on 26 August 2016, he scored his first league goal for the team in 2016 season, scoring in a 2–1 win against Persija Jakarta. 

Yabes made his debut in 2017 season on 8 April 2017 in a friendly match against Persib Bandung in a 1–2 win, he also scored his first goal for the team in this match, where he scored in the 68th minutes. Four minutes later, he was involved in an incident with ghanaian international, Michael Essien.  This incident started when he accidentally kicked the ball at him, Displeased with his actions, Essien tried to chase him. Unfortunately for him, Yabes was given a yellow card by the referee and it was his second yellow card so he had to leave the field.

On 16 April 2017, Yabes made his official league debut in a Liga 1 match against Madura United in a 2–0 away lose. On 14 May 2017, Yabes scored his first league goal for Bali United with scored a brace, where he scored in the 23rd and 70th minutes, final result, Bali United win 3–0 over Borneo.

On 21 May 2019, he scored the opening goal as well as the decisive goal for Bali United in a 1–0 win over Bhayangkara. On 31 December 2019 , Yabes extended his contract with the club along with Muhammad Taufiq. On 18 September 2021, he scored in a 2–2 draw over Persib Bandung at the Indomilk Arena, Tangerang.

International career 
He made his international debut for the Indonesia under-19 team in the 2014 AFC U-19 Championship qualifiers and only appeared as a substitute in the 70th minute, replacing Dinan Yahdian Javier. He could have scored a goal in the 85th minute after a pass from Paulo Sitanggang. However, Indonesia won 2-0.

He made his international debut for the senior team on 8 June 2017 against Cambodia.

Career statistics

Club

International

Honours

Club
Bali United
 Liga 1: 2019, 2021–22

International 
Indonesia U-23
 Southeast Asian Games  Bronze medal: 2017
Indonesia
 Aceh World Solidarity Cup runner-up: 2017
 AFF Championship runner-up: 2020

References

External links
 Yabes Roni at Soccerway
 

1995 births
Living people
Indonesian footballers
Sportspeople from East Nusa Tenggara
Bali United F.C. players
Indonesia youth international footballers
Association football midfielders
Southeast Asian Games bronze medalists for Indonesia
Southeast Asian Games medalists in football
Competitors at the 2017 Southeast Asian Games
Liga 1 (Indonesia) players
Indonesia international footballers
Indonesian Roman Catholics